HMS Simoom (sometimes incorrectly spelled Simoon) was an  destroyer which served with the Royal Navy during World War I. Launched on 30 October 1916, the vessel operated as part of the Harwich Force until torpedoed by the German destroyer  on 23 January 1917. The ship's magazine exploded and 47 people died.

Design and development

Simoom was one of eight  destroyers ordered by the British Admiralty on 21 December 1915 as part of the Seventh War Construction Programme. The design was generally similar to the preceding M class, but differed in having geared turbines, the central gun mounted on a bandstand and minor changes to improve seakeeping. The ship was named after the simoom, a dry wind that sweeps across the Arabian peninsula.

Two funnels were fitted, two boilers exhausting through the forward funnel.

Armament consisted of three  Mk IV QF guns on the ship's centreline, with one on the forecastle, one aft on a raised platform and one between the funnels. A single 2-pounder (40 mm) pom-pom anti-aircraft gun was carried, while torpedo armament consisted of two twin mounts for  torpedoes. The ship had a complement of 90 officers and ratings.

Construction and career
Construction was very swift, with the keel laid down by John Brown & Company at Clydebank in May 1916, launching taking place in October and fitting out completed in December. The build took a very impressive 214 days, faster than any of the rest of the class. The vessel started preliminary trials on 16 December, completing trials in six days. On commissioning, Simoom joined the 10th Destroyer Flotilla as part of the Harwich Force under the flotilla leader . The destroyer was allocated the pennant number F57.

The vessel formed part of the force led by Commodore Reginald Tyrwhitt that put out to intercept a flotilla of eleven destroyers of the Imperial German Navy, led by the flotilla leader , in the North Sea on 22 January 1917. During a confused night battle, the destroyer  became separated from the rest of the German fleet. The lone destroyer surprised Simoom, which was leading the line of British vessels, in the early hours of the following day. Gunfire was exchanged, then S50 managed to unleash a torpedo which hit a magazine and a huge explosion engulfed Simoom.

References

Citations

Bibliography

 
 
 
 
 
 
 
 
 
 
 

1916 ships
Ships built on the River Clyde
R-class destroyers (1916)
World War I destroyers of the United Kingdom